Yung Shue Au is a Hakka village and the name of the surrounding area located in northeast the New Territories, Hong Kong.  Administratively, it falls within the North District.

Administration
Yung Shue Au is a recognized village under the New Territories Small House Policy.

Geography
The location of Yung Shue Au is adjacent to Starling Inlet and close to the maritime border between Hong Kong and Shenzhen.

Yung Shue Au means banyan pass, a mountain pass next to the north bay of Yung Shue Au Bay on the peninsula northeast of Pat Sin Leng.

History
Founder of the village is a person named WAN Mein Cheong who came from Hui Zhou of mainland China.

References

Further reading

External links
 Delineation of area of existing village Yung Shue Au (Sha Tau Kok) for election of resident representative (2019 to 2022)

Villages in North District, Hong Kong